Gallery of Archduke Leopold Wilhelm in Brussels is a 1651 painting of Archduke Leopold Wilhelm's Italian art collection by the Flemish Baroque painter David Teniers the Younger, now in the Royal Museums of Fine Arts of Belgium.

The painting shows the Archduke as a collector admiring a set of prints on a table. The table has been documented as a creation of the sculptor Adriaen de Vries depicting Ganymede. The artist himself is showing his patron an example of a print. The paintings are arranged in rows on a rear wall, and is one of the first that David Teniers the Younger prepared to document the Archduke's collection before he employed 12 engravers to publish his Theatrum Pictorium, considered the "first illustrated art catalog". He published this book of engravings after the Archduke had moved to Austria and taken his collection with him. It was published in Antwerp in 1659 and again in 1673.

This painting was purchased for the museum's collection in 1873 from J. Nieuwenhuys in Brussels.

List of paintings depicted
The following list is of the recognisable paintings of the collection, not all of which were included in the Italian catalog prepared by Teniers, which was a selection of 243 of the most prized paintings out of a collection of 1300-1400 pieces. Many are still in the Viennese collection. The list begins with the paintings on the rear wall, running from left to right and from top to bottom.

References

Sources
 David Teniers and the Theatre of Painting, exhibition 19 October 2006 to 21 January 2007 on website of the Courtauld Institute of Art

1650s paintings
Paintings in the collection of the Royal Museum of Fine Arts Antwerp
Paintings in the collection of the Archduke Leopold Wilhelm of Austria
Paintings of art galleries
Collections of the Royal Museums of Fine Arts of Belgium
Paintings by David Teniers the Younger